An ancient lake is a lake that has consistently carried water for more than one million years. Twelve of the twenty ancient lakes have existed for more than 2.6 million years, the full Quaternary period. Ancient lakes continue to persist due to plate tectonics in an active rift zone. This active rift zone creates lakes that are extremely deep and difficult to naturally fill with sediment. Due to the prolonged life of ancient lakes, they serve as models for isolated evolutionary traits and speciation. Most of the world's bodies of water are less than 18,000 years old. There are only 20 ancient lakes over 1 million years old.

Lake Baikal is often considered the oldest, as clear evidence shows that it is 25–30 million years old. Lake Zaysan may be even older, of Cretaceous origin and at least 66 million years old (most likely around 70 million years), but its exact age is controversial and labelled with some uncertainty. Another contender for oldest is Lake Maracaibo, estimated to be 20–36 million years old. In ancient times it was indisputably a true lake, but today it is saline and directly connected to the sea, leading many to consider it a large lagoon or bay.

Ancient lakes vs. younger lakes 
There are six major types of lakes (Listed below). The majority of lakes dry up as the result of the filling with lacustrine deposits, sediment deposited from a river into a lake over thousands of years. Factors that influence the water level decreasing includes fluvial-lacustrine sediment build up, evaporation, natural drainage and geophysical processes. Ancient Lakes have a prolonged life when compared to younger more ordinary lakes due to the local active rift zones and subsided sections of land called grabens.

 Rift lakes
 Landslide and ice dam lakes
 Salt lakes
 Oxbow lakes
 Crater lakes
 Glacial lakes
 Subglacial lakes

Formation of ancient lakes
Ancient lake formation is similar to that of a rift valley. Formation occurs within a graben that is located on an active rift zone. Grabens are sections of land, formed along divergent plate boundaries, which have subsided between two parallel plates. The location of the graben above the active rift zone results in a lake bottom that is constantly dropping in depth and walls increasing in height.

Importance to evolution
Ancient lakes allow scientists to study the  mechanisms of environmental changes over glacial-interglacial timescales. Evolutionary characteristics including sexual selection, adaptive radiation and punctuated equilibrium are studied in ancient lakes due to their prolonged existence and  general geographic isolation. Most of the research has been associated with the endemic fauna and diatoms that exist in these isolated lakes, concentrating on Lake Baikal, the Caspian Sea and the African Great Lakes. Information is derived from the associations of the fluvial-lacustrine, fluctuating profundal and evaporative facies.

List of ancient lakes 
These are the 20 ancient lakes in the world that have existed for more than 1 million years.

References

 Stoermer, Eugene F., and J. P. Smol. "11.1–11.2." The Diatoms: Applications for the Environmental and Earth Sciences. Cambridge, UK: Cambridge UP, 2001. 209–12. Print.
 Wilke, Thomas, Risto Väinölä, and F. Riedel. Patterns and Processes of Speciation in Ancient Lakes: Proceedings of the Fourth Symposium on Speciation in Ancient Lakes, Berlin, Germany, September 4–8, 2006. Dordrecht, the Netherlands: Springer, 2009. 126–28. Print. 
 Vaillant, J. J., G. D. Haffner, and M. E. Cristescu. "The Ancient Lakes of Indonesia: Towards Integrated Research on Speciation." Integrative and Comparative Biology 51.4 (2011): 634–43. Web. Nov. 2015
 Carroll, Alan R., and Kevin M. Bohacs. "Stratigraphic Classification of Ancient Lakes: Balancing Tectonic and Climatic Controls." Geol Geology 27.2 (1999): 99. Web
 Hoffmann, N., K. Reicherter, T. Fernández-Steeger, and C. Grützner. "Evolution of Ancient Lake Ohrid: A Tectonic Perspective." Biogeosciences 7.10 (2010): 3377–386. Web. Nov. 2015.

External links 

 Species in Ancient Lakes (SIAL)

Limnology
Lakes by type
Ancient lakes